Epicauta funebris, known generally as the margined blister beetle or ebony blister beetle, is a species of blister beetle in the family Meloidae. It is found in North America. It is similar in color to Epicauta cinerea.

References

Further reading

External links

 

Meloidae
Articles created by Qbugbot
Beetles described in 1873